The communauté de communes Pays de Nérondes is located in the Cher  département  of the Centre-Val de Loire region of France. It was created on 1 January 2007 and its seat is Nérondes. Its area is 250.3 km2, and its population was 4,879 in 2018.

Composition
The communauté de communes consists of the following 12 communes:

Bengy-sur-Craon 
Blet 
Charly
Chassy 
Cornusse
Croisy 
Flavigny
Ignol
Mornay-Berry
Nérondes
Ourouer-les-Bourdelins
Tendron

References

Nerondes
Nerondes